Briedis (Old Latvian orthography: Breedis; Latvian feminine: Briede; Lithuanian feminine: Briedienė (married or widow) and Briedytė (unmarried)) is a Latvian and Lithuanian surname, either derived from the Latvian word for "deer" or Lithuanian word for "moose". Individuals with the surname include:

Arnold Briedis (born 1955), former Australian rules footballer
Frīdrihs Briedis (1888–1918), Latvian colonel and a Latvian Riflemen commander
Leons Briedis (born 1949), a Latvian poet, a novelist, an essayist, a literary critic and publisher, translator of prose and poetry
Vytautas Briedis (born 1940), a former Lithuanian rower
Uldis Briedis (born 1942), a Latvian politician
Mairis Briedis (born 1985), a Latvian professional boxer

Latvian-language masculine surnames 
Lithuanian-language surnames